Five ships of the Royal Navy have been named HMS Cerberus  or Cerbere after Cerberus, the three-headed dog in Greek mythology that guards Hades:

  was a 28-gun sixth-rate frigate launched in 1758 and burnt in 1778.
  was a 32-gun fifth-rate frigate launched in 1779 and wrecked attempting to exit Castle Harbour, Bermuda, via Castle Roads in 1783.
  was a 32-gun fifth-rate frigate launched in 1794 and sold in 1814 after service in the French Revolutionary and Napoleonic Wars.
  was a 7-gun gun-brig that HMS Viper captured from the French in 1800. She was wrecked in 1804.
  was a 46-gun fifth-rate frigate launched in 1827 and broken up by 1866.

See also
The Royal Australian Navy have used the name for a number of ships and shore establishments:
  was a breastwork monitor launched in 1868.  She converted into a depot ship in 1918 and was renamed Platypus II. She was sunk as a breakwater in 1926.
  is a training establishment opened in 1920 in Victoria.
  was named HMAS Cerberus in 1921 when serving as a tender to the training establishment.

References

Royal Navy ship names